Etna Bay is a bay in eastern Kaimana Regency, situated in the southeastern corner of West Papua province, Indonesia. The port town of Kaimana is located to the west of Etna Bay.

The Etna Bay languages are spoken in the area.The bay got its name from the Etna expedition.

See also
 Etna Bay languages

References

Bays of Indonesia
Landforms of Western New Guinea
Landforms of West Papua (province)